The 1955–56 Hapoel Haifa season was the club's 33rd season since its establishment in 1924, and 8th since the establishment of the State of Israel.

At the start of the season, the league which started during the previous season was completed, with the club finishing 9th. The new league season, with the top division being re-named Liga Leumit, began on 3 December 1955 and was completed on 3 June 1956, with the club finishing 6th.

During the season, the club also competed in the State Cup, which was also carried over the summer break. The club was eliminated by city rivals Maccabi Haifa in the quarter finals, losing 0–4.

On 15 September 1955 a new stadium, Kiryat Eliezer Stadium, officially called Haifa Municipal Stadium or Luigi Antonini Stadium, was opened with a match between a Haifa XI and a Tel Aviv XI. Hapoel Haifa started playing home matches in the stadium on 16 October 1955, starting with a match against Hapoel Balfouria.

Match Results

Legend

International friendly matches
During the season Hapoel Haifa played one international friendly match, against Sunderland, which the club lost.

1954–55 Liga Alef
The league began on 6 February 1955, and by the time the previous season ended, only 20 rounds of matches were completed, with the final 6 rounds being played during September and October 1955.

Final table

Matches

Results by match

1955–56 Liga Leumit

Final table

Matches

Results by match

State Cup

References

Hapoel Haifa F.C. seasons
Hapoel Haifa